Weatherproof is the debut EP by American hip hop artist Cage. It was released on Eastern Conference Records on July 29, 2003. It was released between his two collaboration albums with Camu Tao (Nighthawks, 2002) and Tame One (Waterworld, 2004) and features guest appearances from both.

Track listing

References

External links

Cage's Official Website

Cage (rapper) EPs
2003 debut EPs